Emmanuel Cascione (born 22 September 1983) is an Italian football coach and a former player who played as a midfielder. He was most recently the manager of  club Pistoiese.

Playing career
Cascione was signed by West Ham United in July 2000, and released in January 2002. He then joined Pistoiese, at that time at Serie B. He followed the club relegated to Serie C1, and returned to Serie B by joined Rimini in summer 2005.

Cesena
In the summer of 2013 he joined Parma on a free transfer. In August 2013 Cascione was signed by Serie B club Cesena in temporary deal, Cesena also received €500,000 from Parma as premi di valorizzazione.

On 30 June 2014, Cascione was signed by Cesena outright in three-year contract, in a direct cashless swap with goalkeeper Nicola Ravaglia.

Coaching career
On 17 July 2019, he joined Serie D club Cattolica Calcio San Marino as a head coach.

In July 2022, Cascione was hired by Serie D club Pistoiese. He was sacked on 25 October 2022 due to negative results.

References

External links
Pescara Calcio profile

1983 births
Living people
People from Catanzaro
Sportspeople from the Province of Catanzaro
Footballers from Calabria
Italian footballers
Association football midfielders
Serie A players
Serie B players
Serie C players
Serie D players
West Ham United F.C. players
U.S. Pistoiese 1921 players
Rimini F.C. 1912 players
Reggina 1914 players
Delfino Pescara 1936 players
A.C. Cesena players
Santarcangelo Calcio players
Forlì F.C. players
Italian expatriate footballers
Expatriate footballers in England
Italian football managers
U.S. Pistoiese 1921 managers
Serie D managers